Eastern Peripheral Nahuatl is a group of Nahuatl languages, including the Pipil language of El Salvador and the Nahuatl dialects of the Sierra Norte de Puebla, southern Veracruz, and Tabasco (Isthmus dialects):

Sierra Puebla Nahuatl
?Southeastern Puebla Nahuatl (Tehuacan–Zongolica)
Isthmus Nahuatl
Pipil and Tabasco Nahuatl  (incl. extinct Chiapas Nahuatl?)

The boundaries of Eastern Nahuatl are not clear. Southeastern Puebla (Tehuacan-Zongolica) is particularly ambiguous. Hasler (1996:164) summarizes the situation, 
"Juan Hasler (1958:338) interprets the presence in the region of [a mix of] eastern dialect features and central dialect features as an indication of a substratum of eastern Nahuatl and a superstratum of central Nahuatl. Una Canger (1980:15–20) classifies the region as part of the eastern area, while Yolanda Lastra (1986:189–190) classifies it as part of the central area."

References 

Nahuatl
Languages of El Salvador